Wayne Collins  is the name of:

 Wayne Collins (footballer) (born 1969), English footballer
 Wayne Collins (politician), Canadian journalist and politician
 Wayne M. Collins (1900–1974), American civil rights attorney
 Wayne Collins (actor) (born 1978), American actor and voice actor
 Wayne Collins (rugby league) (born 1967), Australian player and coach